G-Land, also known as Plengkung Beach, is an internationally renowned surf break on Grajagan Bay, Banyuwangi, Alas Purwo National Park, East Java, Indonesia, about half a day by road from the popular tourist destinations of Bali. It is most commonly reached via boat charter from Bali.

Discovery

The discovery in the protected jungle of Alas Purwo began when an Australian surfer searched intently for surf breaks on the southeast coast of Java during mid-1971. Prior to that, whilst surfing in Western Australia, he had witnessed the huge rolling swells traveling north through the Indian Ocean. He had a theory there was great surfing potential in Indonesia.

His discovery was noted by Bob Laverty, and so the legendary tales began. Four years after the discovery, Mike Boyum helped set up the first surf camp at G-Land, which was possibly the start of the surf camp concept that has since spread across the globe. Balinese surfer Bobby Radiasa took over the operation in the late 70s and still runs it today. From the days of the original Boyum/Bobby's camp other camps have opened at G-Land offering various standards of accommodation and facilities to suit a range of holiday budgets.

Geomorphology 

The south coast of Java faces the Indian Ocean, so it is exposed to large swells generated by low pressure systems circling Antarctica, many thousands of kilometers to the south. G-Land is situated on the eastern side of the Bay of Grajagan, so it has a westerly aspect; i.e. at right angles to the predominant swell direction. As a result, swell wraps around the point and into the eastern side of the bay, producing long, walling left-handers, which peel at a rapid rate along a half-kilometer stretch of shallow coral reef, forming perfectly hollow tubes that remain open the whole way.

The wind at G-Land blows offshore between the months of April and September, which also happens to be when the swells are at their largest and most consistent. Since the swells are generated by low pressure systems circling Antarctica, their regularity coincides with the passage of these lows. So, the swell arrive in pulses, each lasting for a couple of days, with a couple of days between each swell.

Waves tend to be bigger and better at high tide, so it is best to plan a surf trip for the week following a full or new moon, since this is when the tide is high during the middle of the day.

Tsunami 
Java is situated in a tectonic subduction zone, where the Indo-Australian Plate is moving northward, sliding under the Eurasian Plate at a rate of 67 mm/yr. Occasionally, however, the tectonic plate suddenly slips a much greater distance, resulting in an earthquake. In 1994, a major earthquake, registering 7.2 on the Richter Scale, occurred in the Java Trench, 205 km SW of G-Land. The quake triggered a tsunami, which swept through the surf camp about 40 minutes later. The runup at G-Land was estimated to have been as high as 5.6 meters. There were no deaths at G-Land. However, 223 people perished further west, where the villages of Rajekwesi, Pancer and Lampon were almost completely leveled by the tsunami.

Surfer John Philbin was at G-Land on the night June 3, 1994, of the tsunami. He described hearing the surf and thinking it must be big. "But when the roar grew louder, I sat up inside my mosquito net, and just as I did, a churning wall of water blew through my hut." Richie Lovett described the experience as "being hit by a train at full speed". Richard Marsh initially thought a tiger was attacking them, but then realized it was a wave. Marsh and Lovett were swept hundreds of feet into the jungle by the wave. "I was completely panicking. It was a matter of surviving, just grabbing onto things to stay above the water, trying to keep all the debris away from my head and, above all, to get a breath." Marsh said. Lovett had to be returned to Australia for medical attention. "The hut had disappeared and I was entwined in logs and trees and bits of bamboo. When the water started to subside. I was stuck with my legs pinned under a whole lot of logs and rubbish."

The other surfers visiting G-Land when the tsunami struck were Australians Monty Webber, Gerald Saunders, Rob Bain, Shanne Herring, Simon Law, Kevin Komick as well as Californians Tyler Rootleib, Eric Collision and Michael Klosterman. (Please provide full list.) Australian surf photographer Peter Boskovic,  aka "Bosco" was at G-land during the tsunami. documented by the Tsunami Survey Team.

Surf break

A very long, world-class, barreling left hand reef/point break breaks along the east side of Grajagan Bay. It has long been considered one of the world's best left hand waves. The correct name of the point upon which the main wave breaks is "Plengkung." The wave becomes shallower and more critical the further down the point one rides the wave. It is one of the most consistently rideable waves in the world in season, with offshore tradewinds and often plentiful swell between the months of, roughly, mid April to mid October.

The G-Land surf break has been divided up into several sections. The first, at the top of the point, is called "Kongs," which breaks up to several hundred metres in length, and can hold quite large sizes (from about 2 to 12 feet+, Hawaiian scale). It is not usually a barrel, nor genuinely world-class, but more a series of takeoff zones with some long wall sections, although it can also barrel on occasions. This is also where surfers can find the 'key-hole' which is a section of the reef that allows a more forgivable paddle out. This section picks up a lot of swell, and is rarely less than 3 feet, and can be a saviour when the rest of the point is too small. This wave can sometimes link up with the next section called "Moneytrees." Moneytrees works from about 2 to 10 feet (Hawaiian scale, or about 4 to 20 feet wave faces), usually breaking over several hundred metres, and is a long, testing, barreling, world-class wave. The barrels become more critical the lower the tide and the larger the swell. Moneytrees may also occasionally link up with the next section called "Speedies," with an outside takeoff section between the two called "Launching Pads." "Launching Pads" can catch the surfer offguard, as it can break a significant way out to sea in larger swells. "Speedies" (named after how fast the wave breaks) is the heaviest wave at G-Land, but can be a perfect, very round barrel for several hundred metres, rideable from about 2 to 8 feet+ (Hawaiian scale). It usually needs larger swells, and low tide can be very dangerous. Most severe injuries at G-Land have occurred at "Speedies."

It is not common to ride a wave more than about 300–400 metres at G-Land, even though the section of the point where rideable waves break is considerably longer (over 1 km long), because the waves usually don't link up with each other.

The dry season (May to October) is far and away the best time to go. That is when the offshore southeast trade winds blow and the swell, pouring out of the Southern Ocean, is at its biggest and most consistent.

Other nearby surf breaks
There are a few other, smaller waves further down and within the bay, which include '"Chickens," "20/20," "Tiger Tracks," Parang Ireng' and a few unnamed others. These waves generally only work on larger swells, but are surprisingly good alternatives when the main point is big. All of these waves can barrel in the right conditions, which generally require higher tides. There are also some right hand waves on the other side of the peninsula at G-Land, but they are fickle, requiring large swells, and no wind or off-season winds.

Another right hand wave is situated about 20 miles east of G-land, which has been featured in Indonesian surf magazines, and dubbed as "Reverse G'''." It is apparently a quality, long, right hand wave (the 'reverse' of G-Land) but which is very difficult to get to, requiring some boat access, and furthermore only works in off-season winds (about late November to April).

See also
 Nias, other notable surfing spot in Indonesia
 List of beaches in Indonesia, for other beaches in Indonesia.

References

External links
 The Chronicles of G-Land
Beaches of Indonesia
Surfing in Indonesia
Tourist attractions in East Java
Geography of East Java